Haftadar (also Romanized as Haftādar and Haftādor; also known as Hafdar, Haftād Dar, Haftādorr, Haft Tahal, and Haft Tahl) is a village in Aqda Rural District of Aqda District of Ardakan County, Yazd province, Iran. At the 2006 National Census, its population was 541 in 160 households. The following census in 2011 counted 466 people in 146 households. The latest census in 2016 showed a population of 404 people in 148 households; it was the largest village in its rural district.

References 

Ardakan County

Populated places in Yazd Province

Populated places in Ardakan County